Wang Ye ( 260–271) was a Chinese politician of the state of Cao Wei during the Three Kingdoms period of China. He served under the Jin dynasty (266–420) after the end of the Three Kingdoms period.

Life
Wang Ye was from Wuling Commandery (武陵郡), which is around present-day Changde, Hunan. He started his career as an official in the state of Cao Wei in the Three Kingdoms period and served as a Regular Mounted Attendant (散騎常侍). Around 260, the Wei emperor Cao Mao secretly summoned Wang Chen, Wang Jing and Wang Ye to discuss a plan to remove the regent Sima Zhao from power. However, Wang Chen and Wang Ye refused to participate in the plot and instead secretly reported it to Sima Zhao. Cao Mao failed in his coup against Sima Zhao and ended up being killed.

Wang Ye continued serving under the Jin dynasty (266–420), which replaced the Cao Wei state after Sima Zhao's son, Sima Yan, usurped the throne from the last Wei emperor Cao Huan. In the early years of Sima Yan's reign, Wang Ye was promoted to Central Protector of the Army (中護軍). In 271, Sima Yan appointed him and Sima Gui (司馬珪) as the Left and Right Supervisors of the Masters of Writing respectively.

See also
 Lists of people of the Three Kingdoms

References

 Chen, Shou (3rd century). Records of the Three Kingdoms (Sanguozhi).
 Fang, Xuanling (ed.) (648). Book of Jin (Jin Shu).
 Pei, Songzhi (5th century). Annotations to Records of the Three Kingdoms (Sanguozhi zhu).

Cao Wei politicians
Jin dynasty (266–420) politicians